The Thoroughbred is a 1925 American silent comedy film directed by Oscar Apfel and starring Macklyn Arbuckle, Theodore von Eltz and Gladys Hulette.

Cast
 Macklyn Arbuckle as Peter Bemis
 Theodore von Eltz as Robert Bemis
 Gladys Hulette as Mitzi Callahan
 Hallam Cooley as Dan Drummond
 Virginia Brown Faire as Gwen Vandermere
 Carter DeHaven as Archie de Rennsaler
 Thomas Jefferson	
 Robert Brower	
 Edith Murgatroyd
 Lillian Langdon

References

Bibliography
 Rainey, Buck. Sweethearts of the Sage: Biographies and Filmographies of 258 actresses appearing in Western movies. McFarland & Company, 1992.

External links
 

1925 films
1925 comedy films
1920s English-language films
American silent feature films
Silent American comedy films
American black-and-white films
Films directed by Oscar Apfel
1920s American films